Midia Oil Terminal is an oil import-export terminal located  offshore the Port of Midia in Constanța County, Romania.  It is one of the biggest oil terminals in the Black Sea that serves as a local hub for crude oil deliveries to the Romanian market. The terminal which started operations in 2008 belongs to the Rompetrol oil company which is owned by Kazakhstans national oil company KazMunayGas.
The terminal serves as a supplier for the nearby Petromidia Refinery also owned by Rompetrol.

The construction of the terminal started in 2006 and was completed by 2008 at a cost of US$150 million.

See also
KazMunayGas
Rompetrol
Port of Midia

References

Oil terminals
Petroleum in Romania